Owzun Qui-ye Do (also Romanized as Owzūn Qū’ī-ye Do and Ūzūn Qū’ī-ye Do) is a village in Tazeh Kand Rural District, Tazeh Kand District, Parsabad County, Ardabil Province, Iran. At the 2006 census, its population was 401, in 81 families.

References 

Towns and villages in Parsabad County